Lord Reid may refer to:
 James Reid, Baron Reid (1890–1975), Scottish Unionist politician and judge
 John Reid, Baron Reid of Cardowan (born 1947), Scottish Labour party politician, cabinet minister, and chairman of Celtic F.C.